The 1896 Michigan gubernatorial election was held on November 3, 1896. Republican nominee Hazen S. Pingree defeated Fusion candidate of the Democratic, People's, and Union Silver parties, Charles R. Sligh with 55.57% of the vote.

General election

Candidates
Major party candidates
Hazen S. Pingree, Republican
Charles R. Sligh, Democratic

Other candidates
Rufus S. Sprague, National Democratic
Robert C. Safford, Prohibition
John Giberson, National

Results

References

Notes

1896
Michigan
Gubernatorial
November 1896 events